The Lakshman Sruthi Orchestra is a Manual Orchestra based in Chennai. It was established in 1987 with 10 members; since then, it has performed over 7,800 times in Tamil, Telugu, Malayalam, Kannada, Hindi, and across the world. This orchestra maintains completely manual orchestration: it does not use synthesizers or any other electronic equipment.

World Record 

The Lakshman Sruthi Orchestra was the first orchestra to carry out a 36-hour non-stop light music performance on 17–18 December 1994 at Kamarajar Arangam in Chennai. In doing so, it set a world record. The performance was inaugurated by Padmashree Dr. K. J. Yesudas and watched by an audience of 24,000 people. This audience included M. S. Viswanathan, T. K. Ramamoorthy, Isaignani Ilaiyaraaja, Shankar–Ganesh, Gangai Amaran, Isai Puyal, A. R. Rahman, T. Rajendar, R. Pandiarajan and Ramarajan.

Special Shows 

As well as performing its own shows, the Lakshman Sruthi Orchestra also put on a show with the well-known playback singers Dr. K. J. Yesudas and Dr. S. P. Balasubramanyam performing together in Paris, France. This same combination was promoted all over the world, with a total of 14 stage shows so far.

At another time, a show made up of film music from the Carnatic tradition was organised. This was presided over by N. S. K. Vaidhyanathan, Kadri Gopalnath, Nithyashree Mahadevan, Sowmya.

On 4 August 1996, a show was held for women only at Chennai at the Kamarajar Arangam.

The orchestra has frequently been involved in devotional music. For the last 14 years, they have performed completely devotional concerts, with free admission, especially for Iyyappa devotees.

In addition, the orchestra has performed large-scale gala shows in many countries around the world. These include Australia, France, Germany, Switzerland, USA, Canada and Denmark.

Thematic Shows 

The Lakshman Sruthi Orchestra has also performed various thematic shows, including: 
 Patriotic Songs (Organised for Kargil Relief Fund) 
 Children's Special 
 Lighting Special 
 Pattikada Pattanama
 Natchathira Pattu Katchery 
 Kaviarasu Kannadasan Hits 
 Padmashree Vairamuthu Hits 
 MGR Hits
 Sivaji Hits
 Rajini Hits
 Kamal Hits 
 K. Balachander Hits
 Manirathnam Hits
 Mohan Hits
 Love Failure Hits
 One Man Show without duet (by Dr. S. P. Balasubrahmanyam)

International Shows 

The Lakshman Sruthi Orchestra has also performed a mobile concert to raise funds and awareness for Gujarat earthquake relief.

External links
 

Indian orchestras